Mike Moyle (born December 7, 1964) is a Republican member of the Idaho House of Representatives since 1998 in the District 14 A seat. Moyle serves has Idaho House Speaker since 2022. Moyle was the House Majority Leader from December 7, 2006 to 2022. As of 2022, he is the longest serving current member of the Idaho House of Representatives.

Education
Moyle graduated from Meridian High School and attended Brigham Young University.

Idaho House of Representatives
Moyle challenged Representative Dave Bivens in the 1998 Republican Primary and won the nomination by 8 votes. He was elected in the general election and has been reelected every two years since. He currently serves as House Majority Leader, a  position he has held since 2006. He previously served as Majority Caucus Chairman from 2002–2006.

In 2021, Moyle proposed a bill which would make it a felony to "collect or convey" other people's ballots. The bill drew criticism from both sides of the aisle, including from the incumbent Majority Caucus Chair Megan Blanksma.

Committee assignments
Resources and Conservation Committee
Revenue and Taxation Committee
Ways and Means Committee
Moyle previously served on the Health and Welfare Committee from 1998–2002.

Elections

References

External links
Mike Moyle at the Idaho Legislature
Campaign site
 

|-

1964 births
1998 Idaho elections
21st-century American politicians
Brigham Young University alumni
Latter Day Saints from Idaho
Living people
People from Star, Idaho
Place of birth missing (living people)
Republican Party members of the Idaho House of Representatives